The 2011 Pacific Nations Cup was a rugby union tournament held between the four national sides on the Pacific Rim: Fiji, Japan, Samoa and Tonga.

Samoa was the reigning champion after they defeated Fiji in the 2010 competition at Apia Park. The tournament began on July 2 and ended on July 13, 2011 with most of the matches hosted by Fiji. Only the match between Asian 5 Nations champion, Japan and Samoa was played at Chichibunomiya Rugby Stadium in Japan. The tournament was moved to Fiji from Japan after the devastating March, 2011 Japan Tsunami.

The tournament was a round-robin where each team plays all of the other teams once. There were four points for a win, two for a draw and none for a defeat. There were also bonus points offered with one bonus point for scoring four or more tries in a match and one bonus point for losing by 7 points or less.

Japan were crowned Champions after defeating Fiji and scoring their fourth try the last play of the final match of the tournament giving them the bonus point they needed to go with an earlier win over Tonga. Ill discipline by Fiji cost them the game and gifted the Pacific Nations Cup to Japan at the expense of Tonga. Fiji finished the match with 12 men after conceding 2 red and 3 yellow cards, an unenviable world record.

Table

Schedule

Round 1

Round 2

Round 3

Top scorers

Top points scorers

Source: irb.com

Top try scorers

Source: irb.com

See also 

2011 IRB Nations Cup

References

External links
 IRB Pacific Nations Cup – from the IRB website (June 6, 2011)
 Schedule 
 (ESPN Rugby stats 

2011
2011 rugby union tournaments for national teams
2011 in Oceanian rugby union
2011 in Fijian rugby union
2010–11 in Japanese rugby union
2011 in Samoan rugby union
2011 in Tongan rugby union